Chan-Ruchey is a rural locality (a Posyolok) in Vidyayevo municipality of Murmansk Oblast, Russia. The village is located beyond the Arctic circle, on the Kola Peninsula. It is 48 m above sea level.

As of the 2010 census, Chan-Ruchey was uninhabited.

References

Rural localities in Murmansk Oblast